Robert Spence (1879 – 1 February 1965) was a Labour Party politician in the United Kingdom.  He was the member of parliament (MP) for Berwick and Haddington in Scotland from 1923 to 1924.

Spence unsuccessfully contested East Renfrewshire at the 1918 general election, and was unsuccessful again when he contested Berwick and Haddington in 1922. He won the seat at the 1923 general election by a narrow margin of 68 votes (0.3% of the total), but was defeated at the next general election, in 1924, and did not stand for Parliament again.

References 

Members of the Parliament of the United Kingdom for Scottish constituencies
1879 births
1966 deaths
Scottish Labour MPs
UK MPs 1923–1924
Politics of East Lothian
Politics of the Scottish Borders